James Robert Dugdale (15 January 1932 – 26 February 2008) was an English professional footballer best known for his career with Aston Villa, with whom he won a F.A. Cup winner's medal in 1957, 2nd Division Championship 1960, Inaugural League Cup Winner 1961. His playing position was Centre-Half (i.e. centre-back in current parlance).

Before playing for Villa, Dugdale started his career at Harrowby F.C. (Liverpool) before moving to West Bromwich Albion, with whom he won a FA Cup winner's medal in 1954. Dugdale was selected on three occasions for England B, while he also represented the FA XI and the Football League XI in 1953–54. He moved to Queens Park Rangers in October 1962, before retiring from the game due to injury in May 1963.

Dugdale had a leg amputated in 1993. He died aged 76 after a long illness, leaving wife Dorothy, daughters Debbie and Nicola and son Russell. A tribute to Dugdale was held at The Hawthorns on 1 March 2008 for West Bromwich Albion's match against Plymouth Argyle. As well as a minute's applause prior to kickoff, players from both teams wore black armbands during the game.

His nephews Ken Dugdale and Alan Dugdale were also footballers.

References

1932 births
2008 deaths
English footballers
West Bromwich Albion F.C. players
Aston Villa F.C. players
Queens Park Rangers F.C. players
English amputees
Footballers from Liverpool
England B international footballers
English Football League players
English Football League representative players
Association football central defenders
FA Cup Final players